Esmailabad (also Romanized as Esmā‘īlābād and Ismā‘īlābād; also known as Esmā‘īlābād-e Korbāl) is a village in Sefidar Rural District, Khafr District, Jahrom County, Fars Province, Iran. At the 2006 census, its population was 377, in 112 families.

References 

Populated places in  Jahrom County